The HD Mountains are located in southwest Colorado.  They are part of the San Juan Mountain range, which are part of the Rocky Mountains.

External links
San Juan Mountains
Save the HD Mountains
Too Wild to Drill (PDF)

San Juan Mountains (Colorado)
Landforms of La Plata County, Colorado
Mountain ranges of Colorado
Ranges of the Rocky Mountains